Limerick is an unincorporated community in Liberty County, in the U.S. state of Georgia.

History
A post office called Limerick was established in 1895, and remained in operation until 1900. The community was named after Limerick, in Ireland, the native home of a large share of the early settlers.

References

Unincorporated communities in Liberty County, Georgia